Bialobrzeski can refer to:

Places 
Białobrzegi County, Poland

Other uses 
Białobrzeski family, a Polish noble family